Sultan Syarif Kasim State Islamic University in Riau is a public university in Pekanbaru, Riau, Indonesia. It was established on January 4, 2005. Before 2005, its name wes IAIN Sultan Syarif Kasim Riau and changed by Religion Ministry of Indonesia's Decree No.8 of 2005. Its current rector is Prof. Dr. H. Munzir Hitami, M.A.

Schools
State Islamic University of Sultan Syarif Kasim Riau has 9 faculties:

Faculty of Tarbiyah and Keguruan
Faculty of Syari’ah and Law
Faculty of Ushuluddin
Faculty of Dakwah dan Communication
Faculty of Science and Technology
Faculty of Psychology
Faculty of Economy and Social
Faculty of Agriculture and Farms
Masters and Doctoral Programs

External links
 Official site

Universities in Indonesia
Educational institutions established in 2005
Universities in Riau
2005 establishments in Indonesia